Carphina lignicolor is a species of longhorn beetles of the subfamily Lamiinae. It was described by Henry Walter Bates in 1865, and is known from northwestern Brazil and eastern Ecuador.

References

Beetles described in 1865
Carphina